The foreign relations of South Africa have spanned from the country's time as Dominion of the British Empire to its isolationist policies under Apartheid to its position as a responsible international actor taking a key role in Africa, particularly Southern Africa.
South Africa is a member of the United Nations, the African Union and the Commonwealth of Nations. Considered a possible permanent addition to the United Nations Security Council, South Africa was elected in 2006 and again in 2010 by the UN General Assembly to serve on the Security Council, which it did until 31 December 2012. Since, South Africa has also been elected as member of the UNSC for the 2019–2020 period. South African President Cyril Ramaphosa was the chair of the African Union from 2020 to 2021, the second time South Africa has chaired the organisation since its formation in 2003.

History

Pre-Apartheid

South Africa, as a key member of the British Empire and Commonwealth as a Dominion, fought alongside the United Kingdom and the Allies in both World War I and World War II, and it participated in the postwar UN force in the Korean War. South Africa was a founding member of the League of Nations and in 1927 established a Department of External Affairs with diplomatic missions in the main Western European countries and in the United States.

Apartheid

South Africa introduced apartheid in 1948, as a systematic extension of pre-existing racial discrimination in the country. As a result, the country became increasingly isolated internationally until apartheid was abolished in 1991 and racial equality introduced between 1990 and 1993. This transition produced a change in South Africa's foreign policy. The country stopped trying to regain regional hegemony and started to behave as a central hub for co-operation as a regional unipole.

Post-apartheid 
Having emerged from the international isolation of the apartheid era, South Africa has become a leading international actor. Its principal foreign policy objective is to develop good relations with all countries, especially its neighbours in the Southern African Development Community (*-see note below) and the other members of the African Union. South Africa has played a key role in seeking an end to various conflicts and political crises on the African continent, including in Burundi, the Democratic Republic of Congo, the Comoros, and Zimbabwe. In August 1998, South Africa assumed the chair of the Non-Aligned Movement, which it relinquished in July 2002.

Eswatini has asked South Africa to open negotiations on reincorporating some nearby South African territories that are populated by ethnic Swazis or that were long ago part of the Swazi kingdom.

Commonwealth of Nations

South Africa was a Dominion of the British Empire and the Commonwealth from 1910 until 1961.

South Africa was a republic outside the Commonwealth from 1961 to 1994, then it became a republic in the Commonwealth of Nations on 1 June 1994.

United Nations Security Council

South Africa was a non-permanent member of the United Nations Security Council from October 2006 until 2008.

South African votes in the UNSC have not been without controversy. In particular, a 'no' vote on a resolution criticising the Burmese government attracted widespread criticism.

South Africa also attempted to vote against economic sanctions for Iran; however, this was changed after South Africa realised that the 'no' vote would be defeated.

South Africa was once again a non-permanent member of the Security Council between 2010 & 2012.

Africa

Americas

Asia

Europe

Oceania

See also

 List of diplomatic missions in South Africa
 List of diplomatic missions of South Africa

References

 Department of Foreign Affairs

External links
 The Sino-Brazilian Principles in a Latin American and BRICS Context: The Case for Comparative Public Budgeting Legal Research Wisconsin International Law Journal, 13 May 2015
 CBC Digital Archives – Canada and the Fight Against Apartheid
 IBSA – India, Brazil, South Africa – News and Media
 South African Embassy in Moscow
 Iran lifted all trade and economic sanctions against South Africa

Videos

 US Policy on South Africa from the Dean Peter Krogh Foreign Affairs Digital Archives
 US Policy on Namibia from the Dean Peter Krogh Foreign Affairs Digital Archives

 
South Africa and the Commonwealth of Nations